This is a list of Members of Parliament (MPs) elected in the 1859 general election.

Constituencies 
Same as List of MPs elected in the 1857 United Kingdom general election.

List

References

See also 

 List of parliaments of the United Kingdom

1859
UK MPs 1859–1865
1859-related lists
1859 United Kingdom general election